The 1893 Purdue Boilermakers football team was an American football team that represented Purdue University during the 1893 college football season. The team compiled a 5–2–1 record and outscored their opponents by a total of 334 to 144 in its first season under head coach D. M. Balliet. William P. Finney was the team captain.

Schedule

References

Purdue
Purdue Boilermakers football seasons
Purdue Boilermakers football